Berkshire East may refer to:

East Berkshire (UK Parliament constituency)
Berkshire East Ski Area, a United States alpine ski area